Osvaldo Mércuri (1944/1945 – 6 February 2021) was an Argentine politician, based in Buenos Aires Province, and member of the Justicialist Party. He was a longtime member of the Buenos Aires Province Chamber of Deputies from 1985 to 2005.  This included two tenures as the President of the Buenos Aires Province Chamber of Deputies: 7 December 1989, to 8 December 1997, and again from 7 December 2001, until 10 December 2005. Mércuri also chaired the national 1994 Constitutional Reform Convention and the Justicialist Party conference.

Biography
Mércuri was born in Lomas de Zamora, Buenos Aires Province, Argentina.

At the time of his death, Mércuri was serving as a member of the Mercosur Parliament (Parlasur). His term in Parlasaur was scheduled to expire on 31 December 2021.

Mércuri died from COVID-19 at a hospital in San Isidro, Buenos Aires Province, where he had been hospitalized for three weeks, on 6 February 2021, at the age of 76. He was survived by his wife, Maria Elena, and their children. Former President of Argentina Eduardo Duhalde, a friend and close political ally, paid tribute to Mércuri on Twitter following his death.

References

1940s births
2021 deaths
Year of birth uncertain
Presidents of the Buenos Aires Province Chamber of Deputies
Members of the Buenos Aires Province Chamber of Deputies
Justicialist Party politicians
Deaths from the COVID-19 pandemic in Argentina
People from Lomas de Zamora